Nana Meriwether (born May 24, 1985) is an American philanthropist, former professional volleyball player, and beauty pageant titleholder. She is known as Miss USA 2012. She competed at Miss USA 2012 as Miss Maryland USA 2012 and finished as the first runner-up. On December 19, 2012, winner Olivia Culpo won Miss Universe 2012, and Meriwether assumed the title of Miss USA three weeks later.

She is additionally the cofounder of the nonprofit organization the Meriwether Foundation, and a two-time All-American volleyball player at University of California, Los Angeles.

Life and career

Early life
Meriwether was born on May 24, 1985, in Acornhoek, Tintswalo Hospital, South Africa. Her father is Delano Meriwether, the first African-American student at Duke University School of Medicine, while her mother, Nomvimbi Meriwether, is South African and works as a lawyer. Her parents had been doing volunteer work in South Africa at the time of Meriwether's birth. She was raised in Potomac, Maryland and graduated from Sidwell Friends School in Washington, D.C.

Meriwether played volleyball at Duke University for one semester. She later transferred to the University of California, Los Angeles, where she was named a two-time NCAA All-American volleyball player and graduated with a degree in political science. After graduating, Meriwether played volleyball professionally for Las Indias de Mayagüez in Puerto Rico, and trained for the United States women's national volleyball team for the 2008 Summer Olympics. She later completed a degree in premedical sciences at the University of Southern California.

Pageantry

State titles
Meriwether competed in her first pageant for the Miss Universe Organization, Miss California USA 2008, representing Malibu, where she didn't place in the semifinals. Meriwether returned to Miss California USA in 2009, this time representing Beverly Hills, where she finished as the third runner-up to Carrie Prejean. Meriwether competed in Miss California USA 2010 and finished as first runner-up to Nicole Johnson. She competed in the Miss California USA for the final time in 2011, where she finished as fourth runner-up to Alyssa Campanella, who would go on to win Miss USA 2011. After competing in Miss California USA for four years, Meriwether returned to her home state of Maryland, and entered Miss Maryland USA 2012. She won the title and received the right to represent the state at Miss USA.

Miss USA 2012
Meriwether represented Maryland at Miss USA 2012, where she eventually finished as the first runner-up to Olivia Culpo of Rhode Island. On December 19, 2012, Olivia Culpo won the title of Miss Universe 2012. Due to pageant protocol, Miss USA must resign her title in order to fulfill her duties as Miss Universe. The first runner-up assumes the title of Miss USA, meaning that Meriwether became the new Miss USA 2012 three weeks later.

Other ventures
Meriwether is a cofounder of the Meriwether Foundation, which she runs along with the members of her family. The organization operates programs in health, education, nutrition, and development in rural and impoverished communities of Southern Africa.  Meriwether worked as an executive assistant to Glenda Bailey, the editor-in-chief of Harper's Bazaar. She has worked for and contributed to Carine Roitfeld's CR Fashion Book, Vanity Fair, and Vogue Australia. Founded by Joseph Lubin, Meriwether joined ConsenSys in 2018 where she helps build decentralized companies and applications for the Ethereum blockchain.

Notes

References

External links
 Profile  at missuniverse.com

1985 births
African-American volleyball players
American beauty pageant winners
American people of South African descent
American women philanthropists
American women's volleyball players
Living people
Miss USA 2012 delegates
Miss USA winners
People from Johannesburg
People from Potomac, Maryland
Philanthropists from Maryland
Sidwell Friends School alumni
University of California, Los Angeles alumni
University of Southern California alumni
African-American beauty pageant winners
21st-century African-American women
21st-century African-American sportspeople
20th-century African-American people
20th-century African-American women
UCLA Bruins women's volleyball players
Duke Blue Devils women's volleyball players